The Open Government Initiative is a department of the Government of Sierra Leone whose  aim is to ensure transparency, accountability and civic participation in governance processes.

References

Non-ministerial departments of the Sierra Leone Government